Ryan Williamson (born 14 March 1996) is a Scottish footballer who plays as a defender for Falkirk. Williamson previously played for Dunfermline Athletic, where he made over 130 appearances, then Partick Thistle.

Career

Dunfermline Athletic
Williamson, the son of former Pars defender Andy Williamson started his career aged 8 at Rothes Juniors Boys Club before joining Celtic as a 12 year old. He left the Bhoys after two seasons joining Dunfermline Athletic in 2010. His first appearance for the Pars came as a substitute against Arbroath in August 2013, and in November of that year he made his full first team debut in a 3–1 home win against Brechin City. After establishing himself in the first team, Williamson went on to make a total of 22 appearances in the 2013–14 season. The following two seasons were marred with injuries. After first dislocating his kneecap against Stirling Albion which forced him out until the end of February 2015, he then fractured his leg against Forfar Athletic in August 2015. This injury saw him miss the majority of Dunfermline's Scottish League One winning season although after recovering and playing in the final four matches of the season, he was rewarded with a two-year contract extension, keeping him at East End Park until summer 2018. Williamson stayed with the side for a further three seasons, before being released in May 2019.

Partick Thistle
Shortly after leaving Dunfermline, Williamson signed a two-year deal with fellow Scottish Championship side Partick Thistle. Williamson scored his first goal for Partick Thistle and his second career goal, in a 2–2 draw with Hamilton Academical in a Scottish League Cup group stage match. Williamson won the second honour of his career helping Thistle win the 2020–21 Scottish League One title.

Falkirk
Williamson left Partick Thistle at the end of the 2020/21 season and then signed for Falkirk, becoming Paul Sheerin's first signing as their manager.

International
Williamson attended the Scotland U17 and U19 training camps in 2013 and 2014 respectively. After an impressive start to the 2017–18 season, Williamson was called up to Scot Gemmill's Scotland U21 squad to face England and Latvia in October 2017. He played in both matches, coming on as a second-half substitute on both occasions.

Career statistics

Honours

Club
Dunfermline Athletic
Scottish League One: 2015–16
Partick Thistle 
Scottish League One: 2020–21

References

External links

UEFA profile at UEFA

Living people
1996 births
Association football defenders
Dunfermline Athletic F.C. players
Partick Thistle F.C. players
Scottish footballers
Scottish Football League players
Scottish Professional Football League players
Scotland under-21 international footballers
Falkirk F.C. players